Rain Shadow is an Australian television drama series which premiered on 7 October 2007 on ABC TV. The six-part series (6 × 1 hour) was produced by Southern Star. Music from The Audreys features in the soundtrack for the show, including the main theme.

Rain Shadow was shot in the Adelaide Hills in South Australia and is set in the fictional district of Paringa, a dry land farming area in a rain shadow. It tells the story of two characters who become the means of each other's future. It stars Rachel Ward as district vet Kate McDonald and Victoria Thaine as new veterinary assistant Jill Blake.

Cast
 Rachel Ward as Kate McDonald
 Victoria Thaine as Jill Blake
 Gary Sweet as Larry Riley
 Heather Mitchell as Sarah Balfour
 Kim Knuckey as Lachlan Balfour
 Shane Withington as Harry Greene
 Tom O'Sullivan as Tom Huppatz
 Carmel Johnson as Ginny Huppatz
 Panda Likoudis as Achmed Aziz
 Grant Piro as James Campbell
 Edwin Hodgeman as Steve Willis
 Nathaniel Dean as Fred Klein
 Michaela Cantwell as Gail Klein
 Brenton Whittle as Kenneth Blake
 Jamie Harding as Andrew Blake
 Nathin Butler as Shane Maguire
 Mollie as Jock, Jill Blake's West Highland White Terrier
 Lily Robinson as Debbie Garland
 Amanda Barkley as Pam (the girl selling puppies)
 Craig Behenna as Patrick
 Alex Vickery-Howe as Ray
 Jude Henshall as Stacey

Episodes

Awards
The show and cast have not won major awards, but have been nominated for several, which include: 
 2008: Victoria Thaine was nominated for Most Outstanding Actress at the Logies.
 2008: the show was nominated for 'Best Telefeature, Mini Series or Short Run Series' at the AFI Awards.

See also
 
 South Australian Film Corporation
 List of Australian television series
 List of Australian Broadcasting Corporation programs

References

External links 
 
 Rain Shadow at the Australian Television Information Archive

Australian drama television series
Australian Broadcasting Corporation original programming
Television shows set in South Australia
Television series by Endemol Australia
2007 Australian television series debuts
2007 Australian television series endings